Alan Middlebrough (4 December 1925 – February 2004) was an English professional footballer who played as a centre forward.

Career
Born in Wardle, Middlebrough played for Morecambe, Bolton Wanderers, Bradford City and Rochdale.

Sources

References

1925 births
2004 deaths
English footballers
Morecambe F.C. players
Bolton Wanderers F.C. players
Bradford City A.F.C. players
Rochdale A.F.C. players
English Football League players
Association football forwards